Smoke is a fictional character in the Mortal Kombat fighting game franchise by Midway Games/NetherRealm Studios. He debuted in Mortal Kombat II (1993) as a hidden opponent and became a secret playable character in Mortal Kombat 3 (1995), making him the franchise's first unlockable fighter. In keeping with his namesake, he is distinguished by the smoke fumes emitting from his body and his smoke-based powers.

A member of the fictional Lin Kuei clan, Smoke has been depicted as both a human ninja and a cyborg in the series. He is also a close friend of fellow clansman Sub-Zero. The character's original storyline sees him forcibly transformed into a cyborg by his clan, but he retains his human soul. This allows him to join Sub-Zero in defending Earthrealm. However, following the events of Mortal Kombat 3, Smoke is reprogrammed into serving Sub-Zero's evil brother Noob Saibot. In the rebooted timeline, he avoids automation, but becomes an undead revenant in service of the Netherrealm.

Smoke has appeared in various media outside of the games, including the 1997 film Mortal Kombat: Annihilation. Reception to the character, particularly his human version, has been generally positive.

Appearances

Mortal Kombat games
Smoke started out as a Lin Kuei assassin alongside the younger Sub-Zero, and had accompanied him to Outworld on the latter's unsuccessful mission of assassinating Shang Tsung. When they returned to the Lin Kuei, they discovered that their clan had chosen to transform their best warriors into cyborgs, having already performed the procedure on Cyrax and Sektor. Smoke and Sub-Zero, not wanting to take part, defected from the clan; Sub-Zero managed to escape, but Smoke was captured and converted into a cyborg, designated LK-7T2. Under the programming of the Lin Kuei, Smoke was forced to hunt his old friend. However, during the events of Mortal Kombat 3 and Shao Kahn's invasion of Earth, Smoke discovered, with Sub-Zero's help, that he had still retained his soul during the automation process, and was in fact one of Raiden's chosen warriors. He aided Sub-Zero in defeating Cyrax and Sektor but was captured by Kahn's forces, taken back to Outworld and locked in the bowels of Kahn's fortress.

Nearly a decade later, however, during the events of Mortal Kombat: Deception, he was discovered by Noob Saibot, who reactivated the cyborg. Smoke's nanotechnology set about repairing and improving his systems, but Noob Saibot reprogrammed him into serving as both his ally and template for a future army of cyber-demons that was to rise from the Netherealm. Although Ashrah's ending depicted Smoke's innate goodness battling his cyborg programming, Smoke remained a tandem with Noob Saibot, and in their noncanonical Deception ending, Smoke assists Noob Saibot in killing Sub-Zero. Mortal Kombat: Armageddons Konquest mode, the pair stage an assault on the Lin Kuei temple located in Arctika, during which it is shown that Smoke has the ability to transform humans into shadow warriors, or dark versions of their former selves. He does battle with Taven but is eventually beaten, after which he teleports away to inform Noob Saibot of Taven's interference with their plan.

In the 2011 Mortal Kombat reboot, Smoke's background was expanded after eighteen years in the series. He was revealed to be a Czech member of the Lin Kuei named Tomas Vrbada''', who was able to actually transform into smoke instead of just having it emanate from his body. This is explained in his ending that describes him as having been kidnapped at a young age by a cult who sacrificed him to a demon by burning him alive. He returned as an enenra and exacted a revenge killing of the cult's members before resuming his human form. In the game's story mode, he futilely attempts to talk the younger Sub-Zero (then Tundra) out of assuming his dead brother's identity, then comes across Shang Tsung and Kano testing rocket launchers in the Living Forest. Smoke fights them both (during which Shang Tsung transforms into the elder Sub-Zero) before being accosted by a robotized Sektor, whom he also defeats in battle. He is then rescued by Raiden from the Lin Kuei's attempt to take him back to headquarters for automation, and Raiden convinces him to compete in the second tournament. In a reversal of fortune, Smoke remains human in the game while Sub-Zero is instead transformed into a cybernetic; Smoke is prevented by Raiden from intervening as Sub-Zero is abducted by the Lin Kuei inside Kahn's arena. He and Sub-Zero later join the Earth warriors in assembling to fight off Kahn's takeover of Earthrealm.  While Raiden and Liu Kang commune with the Elder Gods, the Lin Kuei and Sindel attack. Smoke's neck is broken by Sindel, killing him. His soul is collected and then resurrected by Quan Chi in the Netherrealm, along with his comrade Sub-Zero.

Smoke is seen as Quan Chi's revenant in Mortal Kombat X and identifies as "Enenra", typically appearing with Liu Kang, Kung Lao, Kitana, and Sindel. He is unplayable and plays a minor role in the game's story mode. The downloadable character Triborg is a combination of Smoke, Sektor, Cyrax, and the cybernetic Sub-Zero from the 2011 reboot.

Design
Smoke (played by Daniel Pesina) debuted in Mortal Kombat II (1993) an unplayable gray palette swap of Scorpion with puffs of smoke constantly emanating from his body, and randomly peeked out from behind a tree in the Living Forest stage. In Mortal Kombat 3, he was an indigo-colored swap of cybernetic ninjas Sektor and Cyrax; all were played by Sal Divita. John Turk portrayed all the human ninja swaps, including Smoke, in Ultimate Mortal Kombat 3, in which both versions of the character appeared in the game's attract mode: the human version is about to be chomped in Liu Kang's Dragon Fatality, while the cybernetic begins his "Earth Detonation" finisher. Since his debut, his color palette has consistently featured cool colors such as gray and black, which temporarily changed for his appearances in the three-dimensional games (as Noob-Smoke), with red being added to his character design. In Deception and Armageddon, his upper body was composed entirely of white smoke, instead of flesh and blood or machinery, (but his robot appearance was used as an alternate costume) formed into the shape of a human torso.

Gameplay
In MKII, Smoke (described therein as "an undiscovered warrior from Mortal Kombat One") was one of three hidden characters introduced in MKII, along with Jade and Noob Saibot. He randomly appeared at the start of a match in order to drop vague clues on how to find him, such as "Portal" or "I am one of three." Players could fight him in a secret match in Goro's Lair from the first game after performing an uppercut on the Portal stage and then holding down on the joystick while pressing the start button the instant the series' sound designer Dan Forden popped up onscreen yelling "Toasty!" Smoke shared Reptile's fighting stance, moved with increased speed, and used Scorpion's spear. In MK3, a box containing a gray MK dragon logo was seen in the center of the character-select screen; behind this was the robotic Smoke, who permanently became playable after the correct input of a postmatch code ("the Ultimate Kombat Kode"). Unlike previous hidden characters who acquired their own unique special moves and combination attacks upon becoming part of the standard cast, Smoke continued to use techniques similar to other characters. For MK3, Smoke used a variation of the spear (a three-pronged harpoon that shot from his chest) in addition to Reptile's invisibility and Sektor's teleport uppercut. The human version borrowed Ermac's uppercut decapitation Fatality for UMK3, but in Trilogy he was given his own set of Fatalities, though he retained all of Scorpion's special moves in both games as well as his axe that appeared exclusively in combos. It was not until Deception that Smoke arguably acquired his first original set of moves, many of which involved using the smoke from his body. Before Smoke was included in this title, a tinted Cyrax was used as a filler until the final version of the game was finished; an unlockable photo of him as a tinted Cyrax is hidden in the Krypt in the game's Konquest mode.

Human Smoke was a hidden character accessible in the arcade and home versions of UMK3 by entering a Kombat Kode after selecting Cyber Smoke, but he was playable from the start in the 1996 follow-up compilation title Mortal Kombat Trilogy; the character bios for both titles repeated his MK3 biography of having been automated by the Lin Kuei but retaining his soul. He was initially set to be part of the UMK3/Trilogy storyline as his ending for the former had stated that he was able to somehow escape his artificial body and had entered training in preparation for Mortal Kombat 4, in which he did not appear. His Trilogy ending was altered into his remaining a cybernetic with his human form simply described in retrospect therein.  In MK2011, Smoke's moveset gets a big overhaul; unlike most characters, most of his special moves are new to that game.

According to Prima Games, the human version of Smoke in UMK3 is one of the cheapest Mortal Kombat characters, where they stated "In addition to a Teleport, Harpoon, Air Throw and the normal list of special moves, Human Smoke had one of the best running jabs in the game."

Other media

Smoke made a one-panel appearance in the Midway-produced Mortal Kombat II comic book written and illustrated by MK co-creator John Tobias, as the pilot of the Lin Kuei's hoverjet who briefly conversed with Sub-Zero as the latter planned to launch a sneak attack on Shang Tsung. He was a recurring minor character in the 1995 Malibu Comics miniseries Battlewave, which included sharing the cover of the third issue with Jade. He was a hidden assassin of Shao Kahn and was regularly seen with Jade, likely since fans regularly connected them by their hidden-character status in MKII, while he frequently yelled the phrase "Toasty!" He was capable of turning his entire body into smoke and making himself untouchable, though in a scene in which he and Jade attack Jax and Johnny Cage aboard a plane bound for Outworld, Jax disposes of Smoke by opening a hole in the plane that blows him out. He and Jade had beforehand unsuccessfully attempted to kill a hospitalized Jax following a brutal attack by Goro, and their last appearance was in the third and final issue of the 1995 miniseries Rayden & Kano, in which they tried to kill a weakened Raiden but were stopped by Kano.

In the 1996 animated series Mortal Kombat: Defenders of the Realm, Smoke appears in the fifth episode ("Old Friends Never Die"), voiced by Jeremy Ratchford. He serves the Lin Kuei clan and is seeking Sub-Zero, and is briefly seen in human form and unmasked in a series of flashbacks, in which he and Sub-Zero develop their bond and then attempt to flee the clan after seeing the transformed Sektor and Cyrax. The Lin Kuei grandmaster, an original character named Oniro, hunts them down in order to return them to the Lin Kuei compound for automation; Sub-Zero manages to escape but Smoke elects to stay behind to buy time for Sub-Zero, and is captured and converted. Sub-Zero attempts to help the robotized Smoke remember their friendship, and in the end, Smoke's human soul was able to overpower his programming. Though he stood by his oath to not fight Sub-Zero in combat, Smoke could no longer honor their friendship since Sub-Zero was now an enemy of the Lin Kuei. In one of the aforementioned flashbacks, shown near the end of the episode as Smoke recalls his past, he is shown lying on an operating table at the start of his offscreen automation process, of which a few seconds is depicted while he is seen only from the neck up as he cries out in anguish.

The robotic Smoke appeared in the 1997 film Mortal Kombat: Annihilation and was played by stuntman Ridley Tsui. He shot missiles instead of his harpoon from his chest, and overpowers Liu Kang in battle until Sub-Zero intervenes, enabling Liu Kang to finally destroy him. The plot ignored Smoke's history with Sub-Zero save for a brief mention of his initially having been after Sub-Zero before being reprogrammed by Shao Kahn to go after Liu Kang and Kitana to keep them away from Sindel.

A computer-animated Smoke makes a very brief appearance during the ending of the 15th episode of Mortal Kombat: Conquest ("The Serpent and the Ice") following Sub-Zero's betrayal of the Lin Kuei and the death of the grandmaster. Smoke is summoned by the clan's interim grandmaster as the next warrior to hunt down and kill the traitor, at which point he begins emerging from mist as a faint, grey figure with glowing red eyes just as the screen fades to black.

Smoke makes multiple appearances in the 2021 WB animation movie Mortal Kombat Legends: Battle of the Realms donning his MK9 alternative costume.

Reception
The character has been met with a mostly positive reception. He finished in a three-way tie with Cyrax and Sektor atop GamesRadar's list of "gaming's most malicious machines" ("No one does killer cyborgs quite like MK"), while Robert Workman of GamePlayBook ranked him eighth in his 2010 list of the best series characters. 411Mania.com ranked Cyber Smoke as the best MK character while adding that his presence was missed in the reboot. Smoke placed thirteenth in UGO Networks' 2012 list of the top 50 Mortal Kombat characters. 

Smoke has also gained attention for his "Earth Detonation" Fatality from MK3, for which Topless Robot listed him as the eighth-goofiest MK character, citing the "batshit insane" finisher as well as the smoke flowing around his body. In 2010, IGN ranked it as the series' best-ever finisher (titling it "Smoke Asplodes the Earf"), and, in 2014, rated it second in their top-seven list of the series' most brutal Fatalities. "Smoke indiscriminately kills eight billion men, women, children, and himself, just to embarrass his opponent after a fistfight." UGO simultaneously voted it the best Fatality and the second-most gruesome finisher in 2007 and 2011, respectively. GameSpy included it in their 2009 list of the top ten biggest video-game explosions. However, Game Informer voted it the most confusing finisher. David Saldana of 1UP.com rated it as one of the fifteen worst Fatalities in the series, citing its "stupidity" and the "laziness" of the developers in regards to its creation. Human Smoke's "Teleport Decapitation" finisher from UMK3 also made both lists at thirteenth and fifth, respectively. while Paste ranked it as the seventh-best from that game. The finisher (sixteenth) was one of three appearances for Smoke on Prima Games' 2014 selection of the series' top fifty Fatalities, in addition to his "Bullhorn" Friendship from MK3'' also coming in at 44th and the "Earth Detonation" at 38th.

References

Cyborg characters in video games
Fictional Czech people
Fictional martial artists in video games
Fictional Mi Tzu practitioners
Fictional assassins in video games
Fictional judoka
Fictional polearm and spearfighters
Male characters in video games
Male film villains
Male video game villains
Mortal Kombat characters
Ninja characters in video games
Video game characters introduced in 1993
Video game characters who can teleport
Video game characters who can turn invisible
Video game protagonists
Zombie and revenant characters in video games